UC Davis Health Stadium is a 10,743-seat multi-purpose stadium in the western United States, located on the campus of the University of California, Davis in unincorporated Yolo County, California. Opened as Aggie Stadium on April 1, 2007, it replaced Toomey Field and is the home to the UC Davis Aggies football and women's lacrosse teams. Plans call for the stadium to eventually be built out to 30,000 seats.

The artificial turf playing field is named Jim Sochor Field, after their College Football Hall of Fame coach.

History
The stadium was originally scheduled for completion in time for the 2006 football season, but due to owner requested changes the stadium did not open until 2007.

In the first sporting event held in the new stadium, the UCD women's lacrosse team beat St. Mary's 17–5 on April 1, and Aggie sophomore Patrice Clark scored the first goal. Its first football game was on September 1 against Western Washington; the Aggies lost 28–21.

As part of a partnership with the UC Davis Health System, announced at the Causeway Classic Luncheon on November 15, 2018, the facility was renamed UC Davis Health Stadium on August 1, 2019, for a period of 20 years.

The previous venue, Toomey Field, continues as the home of the Aggies' track and field teams.

Features
The Tavernetti Bell, also known as the "Victory Bell", greets fans entering Aggie Stadium. The bell is named after Thomas Tavernetti (1889–1934) and is rung once for every point scored after an Aggie victory. With the construction of Aggie Stadium, the bell followed from its previous location at Toomey Field.

Gallery

Attendance records

See also
 List of NCAA Division I FCS football stadiums

References

External links

UC Davis Athletics – UC Davis Health Stadium

American football venues in California
Lacrosse venues in California
University of California, Davis campus
College football venues
Multi-purpose stadiums in the United States
Sports venues in Yolo County, California
UC Davis Aggies football
2007 establishments in California
Sports venues completed in 2007